LeanIn.Org (also known as Lean In Foundation) is a 501(c)(3) nonprofit organization founded by Meta Platforms chief operating officer Sheryl Sandberg in 2013 dedicated "to offering women the ongoing inspiration and support to help them achieve their goals." The organization desires to support women in three main ways: community, education, and circles, or small, coordinated peer groups that meet to share their experiences and learn together. Launched after the release of Sandberg's bestselling book, Lean In: Women, Work, and the Will to Lead, the organization views itself as the next step in an effort to change "the conversation from what we can’t do to what we can do." Since its launch, over 380,000 women and men have joined the Lean In community, creating 34,000 Lean In Circles in over 157 countries to date.

The organization is also responsible for annual national campaigns such as #BanBossy and #LeanInTogether, which were designed to accomplish Lean In's goals and establish partnerships. The Lean In Foundation also develops an annual Women in the Workplace Survey in conjunction with McKinsey & Company, which examines female leadership and diversity management across organizations in corporate America.

Background and mission 
The Lean In Foundation was formed in response to the success of Sandberg's book, Lean In: Women, Work, and the Will to Lead. The proceeds from book sales went toward funding the nonprofit.

Circles 
Lean In Circles are communities of peers who “meet regularly to learn and grow together.” Circles were originally designed to have 8 to 12 peers who would meet monthly. Although each circle varies in location and size, all Circles provide robust networks of peer support. Circles frequently involve facilitated discussion on gender issues between both women and men. After a year of operation, there were 14,000 Lean in Circles around the world. To date, over 60,000 women have created Lean In Circles in over 188 countries, and 85% of circle members accredit Lean In Circles for a "positive change in their life."

CSE 
Lean in Computer Science and Engineering Chapter supports women studying computer science and engineering. Founded in collaboration with The Anita Borg Institute, Facebook, and Linkedin, to date, there are over 250 Circles and 6,000 members. In summer 2015, chapter members launched a “Lean IN-terns Program” for students interning at Bay Area tech companies.

Military 
The Lean In Military Chapter launched in September 2015 in partnership with the Department of Defense. Within just one year, the chapter grew to over 100 circles and nearly 2000 members. This Chapter includes all branches of the military.

Veterans 
On May 21, 2016, National Armed Forces Day, Lean In kicked off the launch of Veterans Circles by top influences like Michelle Obama, Sheryl Sandberg, and Senator Amy Klobuchar. The goal is to assimilate and integrate women veterans into civilian communities.

Partnerships 
The Lean In Foundation Partnerships team is responsible for developing and maintaining strategic partnerships for the organizations as well as manage the Circles program. In February 2014, the nonprofit partnered with Getty Images to offer a collection of images that represent women in empowering ways.

Women in the Workplace Survey 
The Women in the Workplace Survey is a comprehensive study conducted by LeanIn.org and McKinsey & Company on current statistics of working women at corporate American companies. The first study was conducted in 2015, building on similar McKinsey research in 2012, and studied more than 118 companies and 30,000 employees.  The 2015 report concluded that in spite of modest improvements, women are still severely underrepresented at every level in the corporate company leadership pipeline, with the “greatest disparity at the senior levels of leadership” and lowest in technology and industrial companies.”. The report disproves the belief that women are underrepresented in leadership because they are leaving companies at higher rates or because they cannot find a work-life balance. Instead, it explains that this disparity occurs because women face an uneven playing field, gender diversity not prioritized widely, and participation in work and family balance programs is low because of fears from both genders that doing so will negatively affect their careers.

The key findings of the study include:
The leadership ambition gap persists.
Women experience an uneven playing field.
Gender diversity is not widely believed to be a priority.
Employee programs are abundant, but participation is low.
There is still inequality at home.
Men and women have very different networks.

Based on the research conducted, it will take over 25 years to reach gender equity at the senior vice-president level of corporate companies and over 100 years to reach equity in the C-suite.

Campaigns

Ban Bossy 

The organization partnered with Girl Scouts of the USA on a public initiative to encourage girls leadership called Ban Bossy. Beyoncé, Jennifer Garner, Condoleezza Rice, Jane Lynch, Diane Von Furstenberg were featured in a promotional video for the project. The campaign suggested that use of the word discouraged women from achieving leadership positions––arguing that when a boy asserts himself, he is recognized as a leader, but in the same scenario when a girl asserts herself, she risks being called as “bossy.” The campaign included pledges to #banbossy, along with a website including education guides and leadership tips to ban bossy in action.

Beyoncé stated in the PSA that “girls are less interested in leadership than boys,” and Lynch who explained “and that’s because they worry about being called bossy.” These statements were backed up by Garner who stated that “being labeled something matters.” Beyoncé's closing quotation served as the basis for the campaign as she said “I’m not bossy, I’m the boss.”

There was some backlash to the campaign. Joan Rivers found the movement petty, while Margot Talbot argued the campaign should have reclaimed the word instead of condemning it.

Lean In Together 
In March 2015, a partnership with the NBA and WNBA was initiated to emphasize "how men benefit from equality and providing practical tips for men to do their part at home and at work."

#20PercentCounts 
In April 2017, the organization launched #20PercentCounts, a national campaign on Equal Pay Day to highlight the importance of closing the gender pay gap. Working with Lean In community leaders in more than 25 U.S. cities, the organization was able to recruit hundreds of businesses to offer 20% off purchases and share information on the gender pay gap in their communities. And In partnership with Funny or Die and Hulu, LeanIn.Org produced a video showing the impact of the pay gap on women's everyday lives, amassing more than 5 million views.

Criticism 
An early criticism of Lean In came from Sandberg's advertisements for unpaid interns in 2013.

Melissa Gira Grant in The Washington Post criticized the concept of the Lean In Circles. She was critical of the requirement to stay "positive" and that working-class women would be left out of the conversation. Some women have had trouble finding the right circle to fit their own needs and lifestyles.

Other critics claim that Lean In is designed for "financially well-off women."

References

Further reading

External links
 

Non-profit organizations based in California
Organizations established in 2013
Organizations based in Palo Alto, California
2013 establishments in California